Charles William Dougherty (February 7, 1862 – February 18, 1925) was a major league baseball player for Altoona Mountain City in 1884. He was their second baseman, and he hit a .259 batting average.

Sources

1862 births
1925 deaths
19th-century baseball players
Baseball players from Wisconsin
Altoona Mountain Citys players
Major League Baseball second basemen
People from Darlington, Wisconsin
Wilmington Blue Hens players
Atlantic City (minor league baseball) players
Altoona Mountain Cities players